The United Press International Lineman of the Year award was given annually by United Press International (UPI) to the lineman of the year in college football. With the demise of UPI in 1997, the award was discontinued. Offensive and defensive linemen were eligible, including offensive ends, with one, Howard Twilley, winning in 1965. Like all UPI college awards at the time, it was based on the votes of NCAA coaches. Ross Browner of Notre Dame was the only two-time winner.

Winners
1950—Les Richter, California
1951—Bill McColl, Stanford    
1952—Tom Catlin, Oklahoma 
1953—J.D. Roberts, Oklahoma 
1954—Jack Ellena, UCLA 
1955—Bob Pellegrini, Maryland 
1956—Jerry Tubbs, Oklahoma 
1957—Alex Karras, Iowa 
1958—Bob Harrison, Oklahoma 
1959—Roger Davis, Syracuse 
1960—Tom Brown, Minnesota 
1961—Joe Romig, Colorado 
1962—Bobby Bell, Minnesota 
1963—Scott Appleton, Texas 
1964—Dick Butkus, Illinois 
1965—Howard Twilley, Tulsa 
1966—Bubba Smith, Michigan State 
1967—Granville Liggins, Oklahoma 
1968—Ted Hendricks, Miami, (Fl) 
1969—Mike McCoy, Notre Dame 
1970—Jim Stillwagon, Ohio State 
1971—Walt Patulski, Notre Dame 
1972—Rich Glover, Nebraska 
1973—John Hicks, Ohio State 
1974—Randy White, Maryland 
1975—Lee Roy Selmon, Oklahoma 
1976—Ross Browner, Notre Dame 
1977—Ross Browner, Notre Dame 
1978—Greg Roberts, Oklahoma 
1979—Brad Budde, USC
1980—Hugh Green, Pittsburgh 
1981—Kenneth Sims, Texas 
1982—Dave Rimington, Nebraska
1983—Dean Steinkuhler, Nebraska
1984—Bill Fralic, Pittsburgh
1985—Tony Casillas, Oklahoma
1986—Jerome Brown, Miami (Fl)
1987—Chad Hennings, Air Force
1988—Tony Mandarich, Michigan State
1989—Chris Zorich, Notre Dame
1990—Russell Maryland, Miami (Fl)
1991—Steve Emtman, Washington
1992—Eric Curry, Alabama
1993—Rob Waldrop, Arizona
1994—Zach Wiegert, Nebraska 
1995—Jonathan Ogden, UCLA
1996—Orlando Pace, Ohio State

References

College football national player awards